99th meridian may refer to:

99th meridian east, a line of longitude east of the Greenwich Meridian
99th meridian west, a line of longitude west of the Greenwich Meridian